"Who Are You" is a song by Turkish singer-songwriter Emine Sari. It was written by Emine for her single "Who Are You" (2012), while production was helmed by Çağrı Açıkgöz. The single was released via digital download on 18 June 2012. Recorded in Turkey, Istanbul. Musically, "Who Are You" is a mid-tempo jazz / swing style song. 
Emine Sari won Best Unsigned Act at Mp3 Music Awards'2013 with her song "Who Are You".

Critical reception
"Who Are You" received mixed reviews from music critics. Michael McCarthy, a columnist and contributing editor for the magazines Lollipop and LiveWire, wrote for LoveIsPop that Who Are You' is a wonderful mix of jazz, swing and pop. The thick upright bass is intoxicating, the horns are wonderful" and called her vocals "unique and infectious".
Rick Jamm from JamsPhere called her single "understated elegance" he noted that : "Jazz has always combined the capacities for deep appreciation of the past and openness to new directions. Emine Sari has captured those qualities on 'Who Are You.

References

External links
 www.eminemusic.com

2012 singles
Jazz songs
2012 songs